Slocum House may refer to:

in the United States (by state)
Slocum House (Fair Oaks, California), listed on the National Register of Historic Places in Sacramento County, California
Slocum Hall, Delaware, Ohio, listed on the National Register of Historic Places in Delaware County, Ohio
Joseph Slocum House, North Kingstown, Rhode Island, listed on the NRHP in Rhode Island
Slocum House (Vancouver, Washington), listed on the National Register of Historic Places in Clark County, Washington